Bikash Panji  is a retired Indian professional football midfielder who played for India.

Playing career
Panji represented India at the 1984 Asian Cup. He also played club football for Mohun Bagan and East Bengal. He scored two goals (both against Bangladesh) during the 1986 World Cup Qualification, as India finished second with 7 points. He has scored 66 goals for East Bengal Club, and captained the team in 1988–89. In East Bengal, he had a lethal combination with Krishanu Dey in the 1980s.

See also
 List of India national football team captains

References

External links
Stats
Profile on East Bengal site

Indian footballers
India international footballers
1984 AFC Asian Cup players
Footballers from West Bengal
Footballers at the 1986 Asian Games
Living people
People from Howrah district
Association football midfielders
Year of birth missing (living people)
Asian Games competitors for India
East Bengal Club players
Mohun Bagan AC players
Calcutta Football League players